This is a list of military attachés and war correspondents in the First World War.

Overview

The multi-national military attachés and observers who took part in the First World War were expressly engaged in collecting data and analyzing the interplay between tactics, strategy, and technical advances in weapons and machines of modern warfare.

Military and civilian observers from every major power closely followed the course of the war.  Most were able to report on events from a  perspective somewhat like what is now termed "embedded" positions within the land and naval forces of both sides.  These military attachés, naval attachés and other observers prepared voluminous first-hand accounts of the war and analytical papers.  In-depth observer narratives of the war and more narrowly focused professional journal articles were written soon after the war; and these post-war reports conclusively illustrated the battlefield destructiveness of this conflict.

War correspondents

Press coverage of the war was affected by restrictions on the movement of non-combatant observers and strict censorship. This raises the question of the role the media plays in selecting news about such conflicts. Events which support the position of either one of the protagonists in a conflict are understood as instrumental factors in the modern mediated conflict, and the publication of information on these events is construed as one of the major goals of the conflicting parties and one important activity of journalists.

See also
 List of participants to Paris Peace Conference, 1919
 Military attachés and observers in the Russo-Japanese War
 United Nations Military Observer

Notes

References

Further reading

 

  World War I
 
World War I-related lists
Lists of journalists